Cameron Johnson (born 1996) is an American basketball player.

Cameron Johnson may also refer to:
Cameron Johnson (actor) (born 1999), American actor
Camron Johnson (born 1999), American college football wide receiver
Cam Johnson (born 1990), American pro football defensive end

See also
Cameron Johnston (disambiguation)